The 1889 Birthday Honours were appointments by Queen Victoria to various orders and honours to reward and highlight good works by citizens of the British Empire. The appointments were made to celebrate the official birthday of The Queen, and were published in the London Gazette on 24 May 1889 and in The Times on 25 May 1889.

The recipients of honours are displayed here as they were styled before their new honour, and arranged by honour, with classes (Knight, Knight Grand Cross, etc.) and then divisions (Military, Civil, etc.) as appropriate.

United Kingdom and British Empire

Baronetcies

Joseph Edgar Boehm, Royal Academy.
George Burns, the founder of the Cunard Line of steamships.
William Mackinnon 
Sir George Hornidge Porter  Surgeon-in-Ordinary to Her Majesty in Ireland.
Professor George Stokes  President of the Royal Society.

Knight Bachelor

Arthur Blomfield 
Charles Frederick Blaine, for services rendered to the Cape of Good Hope.
Benjamin Benjamin, Mayor of the city of Melbourne.
Joseph Crosland, of Huddersfield.
William Crundall, Mayor of Dover.
Edmund Grattan, late Her Majesty's Consul-General at Antwerp.
William Macleay, of New South Wales.
Andrew Reed, Inspector-General of the Royal Irish Constabulary.
James Russell  Chief Justice of Hong Kong.
James Roberton , professor of conveyancing at Glasgow University.
Aubrey Walsh, formerly Chairman of the Justices of Liberty of the Tower.

The Most Honourable Order of the Bath

Knight Grand Cross of the Order of the Bath (KGCB)

Military Division
Admiral His Royal Highness Alfred Ernest Albert, Duke of Edinburgh  Personal Aide-de-Camp to the Queen.
General Sir Frederick Horn 
General Sir John St George   Royal Artillery.
General Sir Archibald Little 
General Sir Henry Daly  Bombay Staff Corps.
Lt.-Gen. and Honorary General Sir Alexander Taylor  Royal Engineers.

Civil Division
Sir William Jenner  one of the Physicians in Ordinary to Her Majesty.

Knight Commander of the Order of the Bath (KCB)
Military Division
Admiral the Hon. Arthur Auckland Leopold Pedro Cochrane  Retired List.
General John William Schneider  Bombay Infantry.
Admiral Algernon McLennan Lyons 
Lt.-Gen. and Honorary General Charles Cameron Shute  
Lt.-Gen. George Wentworth Alexander Higginson  Lieutenant of the Tower of London.
Lt.-Gen. and Honorary General the Hon. David Macdowall Fraser  Royal Artillery.
Lt.-Gen. Allen Bayard Johnson  Bengal Staff Corps.
Maj.-Gen., and Honorary Lt.-Gen. William Augustus Fyers  
Maj.-Gen. the Hon. James Charlemagne Dormer  Commanding the Force in Egypt.
Rear-Admiral the Hon. Edmund Robert Fremantle  
Maj.-Gen. Richard Harrison  Royal Engineers.

Civil Division
Henry Longley  Chief Charity Commissioner for England and Wales

Companion of the Order of the Bath (CB)
Military Division
Lt.-Gen. Alexander Carnegy, Bombay Staff Corps.
Lt.-Gen. David MacFarlan, Royal Artillery.
Lt.-Gen. James Blair  Bombay Cavalry.
Maj.-Gen. George Digby Barker.
Maj.-Gen. Hastings Fraser, Madras Staff Corps.
Capt. Henry Frederick Stephenson  Royal Navy, Aide-de-Camp to the Queen.
Lt.-Col. and Col. Richard William Charles Winsloe, Aide-de-Camp to the Queen.
Lt.-Col. and Col. Robert Grant, Royal Engineers, Deputy Adjutant-General Royal Engineers, Headquarters of the Army.
Col. Henry Wood, 9th Regimental District.
Lt.-Col. and Col. Frederick Lance, Bengal Staff Corps.
Lt.-Col. and Col. George Corrie Bird, Madras Staff Corps.
Lt.-Col. and Col. John Hugh Green, Bengal Staff Corps.
Col. (with the rank of Brigadier-General) Boyce Albert Combe, Commanding a Second Class District of the Bombay Army.
Thales Pease, Deputy Commissary General of Ordnance, with the honorary rank of Colonel, Ordnance Store Department.
Col. William Lewis Kinloch Ogilvy, Assistant Adjutant-General, Cork District.
Lt.-Col. and Col. FitzRoy Stephen.
Maj. and Col. Geoffrey Barton, the Royal Fusiliers (City of London Regiment).
Maj. and Col. Arthur FitzRoy Hart, the East Surrey Regiment.
Lt.-Col. and Col. Henry Grey MacGregor, Aide-de-Camp to the Queen.
Maj. and Col. Andrew Gilbert Wauchope  The Black Watch (Royal Highlanders).
Maj. William George Knox, Royal Artillery.
Maj. George Blake Napier Martin, Royal Artillery.

Civil Division
The Hon. Eric Barrington, Foreign Office.
Doctor James Bell  Principal of the Laboratory Department, Inland Revenue.
Col. William Bell, late 64th Foot, Aide-de-Camp to the Queen, Government Secretary to the Lt.-Governor of Guernsey.
Henry Thomas de la Bere, Deputy Accountant-General, War Office.
Wilfred Joseph Cripps 
David Harrel, Chief Commissioner of the Dublin Metropolitan Police.
Doctor James Reid, Physician Extraordinary to Her Majesty.
George Lisle Ryder, Principal Clerk in the Treasury.
Maj. Henry Samuel Spiller Watkin, Royal Artillery, Inspector of Position Finding, Department of Director of Artillery.
Edward Wingfield, Assistant Under-Secretary of State, Colonial Office.

The Imperial Order of the Crown of India
Her Highness Princess Victoria Louise Sophia Augusta Amélia Helena of Schleswig-Holstein.
Her Serene Highness Princess Victoria Mary Augusta Louise Olga Pauline Claudine Agnes of Teck.

The Most Exalted Order of the Star of India

Knight Commander (KCSI)
Col. Henry Yule  Royal (late Bengal) Engineers, Member of the Council of the Secretary of State for India.

Companion (CSI)
Col. Edward Lacon Ommanney, Bengal Staff Corps.
Henry Edward Stokes, Madras Civil Service, Member of the Council of the Governor of Madras.

The Most Distinguished Order of Saint Michael and Saint George

Knight Grand Cross of the Order of St Michael and St George (GCMG)
Sir Robert Hart  Inspector-General of Chinese Imperial Maritime Customs.
Sir Thomas Francis Wade  late Her Majesty's Envoy Extraordinary and Minister Plenipotentiary at Pekin.

Honorary Knight Grand Cross
Riaz Pasha  Prime Minister of Egypt.

Knight Commander of the Order of St Michael and St George (KCMG)
Charles Bruce  Lt.-Governor and Government Secretary of the Colony of British Guiana.
Langham Dale  Superintendent-General of Education of the Cape of Good Hope, and Vice-Chancellor of the University of that Colony.
James Shaw Hay  Governor and Commander-in-Chief of the Colony of Sierra Leone.
Sir James MacBain  President of the Legislative Council of the Colony of Victoria.
William MacGregor  Administrator of the Possession of British New Guinea.
John Robinson, Member of the Legislative Council of Natal.
Walter Joseph Sendall  Governor and Comraander-in-Chief of the Windward Islands.
Lt.-Gen. Sir Henry D'Oyley Torrens  Governor and Commander-in-Chief of the Island of Malta.
Capt. John Sydney Webb, Deputy-Master of the Corporation of the Trinity House, for services in connection with Lighthouses in the Colonies and abroad.

Companion of the Order of St Michael and St George (CMG)
William George Aston, Japanese Secretary to Her Majesty's Legation in Japan.
Charles Gage Brown  Medical Adviser to the Colonial Office.
Edward Ciantar, Member of the Council of Government of the Island of Malta.
John Stokell Dodds, Puisne Judge of the Supreme Court of Tasmania, and Representative of that Colony at the Colonial Conference of 1857.
Robert Lewis John Ellery, Government Astronomer of the Colony of Victoria.
Hubert Edward Henry Jerningham, Colonial Secretary of British Honduras.
Robert Baxter Llewelyn, Administrator of the Island of Saint Lucia.
Lloyd William Mathews, a General in the Army of His Highness the Sultan of Zanzibar.
George Thomas Michael O'Brien, Treasurer of the Island of Ceylon.
Ponnambalam Ramanathan, Member of the Legislative Council of the Island of Ceylon.
Frederick Warner, Member of the Legislative Council of the Colony of Trinidad.
Louis Antoine Aimé de Vertéuil, Member of the Legislative Council of the Colony of Trinidad.

The Most Eminent Order of the Indian Empire

Knight Commander (KCIE)
Maharana Shri Wakhat Singh Dalil Singh, Raja of Lunavada.
John Ware Edgar  Bengal Civil Service, Chief Secretary to the Government of Bengal.
Sir Henry Mortimer Durand, Anglo-Indian diplomat and member of the Indian Civil Service.
William Markby

Companion (CIE)
Maj. Charles Henry Ellison Adamson, Madras Staff Corps, Deputy Commissioner, Burma.
William Henry Bliss, Madras Civil Service, Member of the Board of Revenue and Commissioner of Salt and Abkari and Separate Revenue.
John Walker Buyers, Superintending Engineer, Public Works Department (Railway Branch), Government of India.
Khalifa Syed Mahomed Hassan, Prime Minister of Patiala.
Brigade Surgeon Isidore Bernadotte Lyon, Bombay Medical Establishment.
Naoroji Nusserwanjee Wadia, of Bombay.

References

Birthday Honours
1889 awards
1889 in Australia
1889 in India
1889 in the United Kingdom